This is a list of films which placed number one at the weekend box office for the year 2013 in Spain.

Highest-grossing films

See also
 List of Spanish films — Spanish films by year

References

2013

Spain